Fort Ann is a former gold mining camp in Amador County, California. Although local tradition has it that Fort Ann began as a military outpost, it began as a mining camp.

The camp was in place by 1852.  Mining occurred in the original camp's vicinity, with some gaps in time, until at least 1941, with people living in the settlement.Interview with Fred Clark, Amador County Historical Society (February 1979) (recorded personal account of resident of Fort Ann Mine area circa 1939-40)  The camp appeared on the 1866 county map.  Evidence of the camp and living quarters was reported to still be visible in 1967.

References

Former settlements in Amador County, California
Former populated places in California